Luis Andrés Carrasco (born October 2, 1963, in Mérida, Yucatán) is a Mexican skeleton racer who competed from 1994 to 2002. He finished 25th in the men's skeleton event at the 2002 Winter Olympics in Salt Lake City.

Carrasco's best finish at the FIBT World Championships was 27th in the men's skeleton event at Lake Placid, New York in 1997.

References
 2002 men's skeleton results
 Skeletonsport.com profile

External links
 

1963 births
Living people
Mexican male skeleton racers
Skeleton racers at the 2002 Winter Olympics
Sportspeople from Yucatán (state)
Sportspeople from Mérida, Yucatán
Olympic skeleton racers of Mexico